George Nicoll (born 22 August 1933) is an Australian former modern pentathlete. He competed at the 1956 Summer Olympics.

References

External links
 

1933 births
Living people
Australian male modern pentathletes
Olympic modern pentathletes of Australia
Modern pentathletes at the 1956 Summer Olympics
20th-century Australian people
21st-century Australian people